The politics of Tokelau takes place within a framework of a parliamentary representative democratic dependency. The head of state of Tokelau is King Charles III in right of his Realm of New Zealand, who is represented by an Administrator (as of 2018, Ross Ardern). The monarch is hereditary, the Administrator is appointed by the New Zealand Minister of Foreign Affairs and Trade.

The current head of government is Siopili Perez, who presides over the Council for the Ongoing Government of Tokelau, which functions as a cabinet. The Council consists of the faipule (leader) and pulenuku (village mayor) of each of the three atolls. The office of head of government rotates between the three faipule for a one-year term.

The Tokelau Amendment Act of 1996 confers legislative power on the General Fono, a unicameral body. The number of seats each atoll receives in the Fono is determined by population — Fakaofo and Atafu each have eight and Nukunonu has seven. Faipule and pulenuku (atoll leaders and village mayors) also sit in the Fono.

Self-determination 
On 11 November 2004, Tokelau and New Zealand took steps to formulate a treaty that would transform Tokelau from a New Zealand territory to an entity that is in free association with New Zealand. Besides drafting a treaty, a United Nations-sponsored "act of self-determination" had to take place. The referendum, supervised by the UN, started on 11 February 2006 and finished on 15 February 2006. Although a 60% majority voted in favour of the proposal, a two-thirds majority was required for the referendum to succeed, so Tokelau remained a New Zealand territory. In June 2006, Kolouei O'Brien announced that the Fono had agreed to hold another referendum. This second referendum took place between 20 and 24 October 2007 and again fell short of the two-thirds majority required for independence, with 64% voting in favour. In April 2008, speaking as leader of the National Party, future New Zealand Prime Minister John Key stated that New Zealand had "imposed two referenda on the people of the Tokelau Islands" and questioned "the accepted wisdom that small states should undergo a de-colonisation process".

Executive Branch

Administrator of Tokelau 
The Administrator of Tokelau is appointed by the New Zealand Government and is the head of the executive branch of Tokelau. Since 1994, however, most powers relating to the day-to-day functions of the government have been transferred to institutions which are chosen by the Tokelauan people. A notable exception is the administration of Tokelau's exclusive economic zone.

Since 1 June 2022, the current Administrator is Don Higgins, who "...has previously served as High Commissioner in Solomon Islands and Kiribati, and as an Adviser to the Tokelau Administrator from 2012 to 2014."

Ulu-o-Tokelau 
The Ulu-O-Tokelau serves as the titular head of state and heads the national government. The office rotates among the three Faipule (atoll leaders) each year. He chairs the Council for the Ongoing Government. The seat of government of Tokelau changes each year to be located on the atoll of the incumbent Ulu o Tokelau.

Council for the Ongoing Government 
The Office of the Council for the Ongoing Government of Tokelau (OCOG) is tasked with managing Tokelau's foreign affairs, providing support and advice to national leaders, and working with villages to develop and implement national programs and activities. The OCOG is based in Apia, Samoa. The OCOG also links together the traditional village-based governing structure and the national government.

Members of the OCOG are the three Faipule and three Pulenku. Members meet while the General Fono is out of session to continue governing the islands.

For the period 2017–19, the Council of the Ongoing Government of Tokelau, or Cabinet, was as follows.

Legislative Branch 
The legislative branch of the Tokelau government is known as the General Fono. The General Fono is composed of twenty seats allocated among the three atolls based on population. In 2008, Atafu received seven seats while Fakaofo and Nukunonu each received six.

The General Fono meets for three session per year, with each session lasting around four days. Members of the General Fono elect their Chairman. The Chairman for 2019 is Stanley Lopa, while the deputy chair is Sakaria Sakaio.

The Tokelau Amendment Act, passed by the New Zealand Parliament in 1996, granted the General Fono the ability to pass laws which helped maintain "the peace, order, and good government of Tokelau", including the ability to levy taxes.

New Zealand law does not automatically apply to Tokelau, and any bill seeking to be applied in Tokelau must specifically extend its authority to the islands. No law passed by the New Zealand Parliament has ever been extended to Tokelau without  Tokelauan consent.

Elections 
Elections in Tokelau occur every three years. At these elections, voters choose members of the General Fono, one Faipule (Village Head) for each atoll, and one Puluenuku (Mayor) for each atoll.

See also 
 Constitutional history of Tokelau
 2008 Tokelauan general election

References

External links 
The Modern House of Tokelau: Self-determination in a Pacific Atoll Nation
'Tokelau wonders, "What have we done wrong?"'

 
Elections in Tokelau
Political parties in Tokelau